Walter Stalker (29 October 1909 – 13 January 1977) was an Australian cricketer. He played one first-class cricket match for Victoria in 1933.

See also
 List of Victoria first-class cricketers

References

External links
 

1909 births
1977 deaths
Australian cricketers
Victoria cricketers